"Hero Worship" is the 111th episode of the syndicated American science fiction television series Star Trek: The Next Generation.  This is the 11th episode of the fifth season, directed by series' castmember Patrick Stewart (Captain Jean-Luc Picard). Star Trek creator Gene Roddenberry died during the filming of this episode.

Set in the 24th century, the series follows the adventures of the Starfleet crew of the Federation starship Enterprise-D. In this episode, Data rescues an orphaned boy from a damaged ship. As a way to repress his own pain, the boy begins to mimic Data's personality.

Writing 
This episode was written by Hilary J. Bader; Bader began as TNG season 3 writing intern, and would also write for "The Loss" and "Dark Page" (3 total for TNG). Bader went on to write for many children's cartoon shows and comic books.

The teleplay was written by Joe Menosky.

Plot
The U.S.S. Enterprise is sent to investigate the disappearance of the research vessel Vico which had been dispatched to explore the Black Cluster in section 9–7. They encounter the ship adrift just outside the cluster, with apparent heavy battle damage. Lt. Commander Data (Brent Spiner), Chief Engineer Geordi La Forge (LeVar Burton), and Commander William Riker (Jonathan Frakes) beam aboard to investigate. Everybody on the Vico is dead, except for one survivor - a young, traumatized boy named Timothy (Joshua Harris). Commander Riker tries to have Timothy beamed into sickbay on the Enterprise. But the attempt is futile, due to the boy being pinned down by a fallen beam that is interfering with the energizing matter stream. Ensign Hutchinson tells Riker that in order to beam the boy onto the Enterprise, they need to get him out of the debris and take him to the unshielded corridor of the Vico. Data tells Riker that he can lift the wreckage to free the boy, but that it might quicken the imminent hull breach. At Data's suggestion, Riker and Geordi return to the Enterprise. Using his strength to lift the beam, Data frees Timothy and they rush to the corridor, allowing them to be beamed back into the Enterprise just in time before the hull collapses.

As Dr. Beverly Crusher (Gates McFadden) examines him in sickbay, Timothy tells the crew that his ship was attacked by some unknown aliens who forcibly boarded the Vico. Having lost both his parents (his mother, the systems engineer of the Vico, was found dead in another part of the ship, while his father, the Vicos second officer, was likely blown into space when the Vicos bridge was exposed), Timothy is very afraid and struggles to blend into his new surroundings, isolating himself from the other children and the other adults. Timothy only trusts Data, mostly because he rescued him. Data also finds himself concerned for the boy and learns about how parental figures provide important support to a child's emotional well-being after listening to Geordi recalling a traumatic event when he was a child.

Captain Jean-Luc Picard (Patrick Stewart) investigates the Vicos destruction with Geordi and Data. Geordi says that there were no records or evidence indicating that any boarding parties came onto the Vico. Picard suspects that Timothy isn't being entirely honest, but can't question him since Timothy is still in shock. Worried about Timothy's emotional well-being and having witnessed the growing connection between the boy and the android officer, Counselor Deanna Troi asks Data to spend time with Timothy. She tells Captain Picard that it is possible that Timothy might open up to Data about the truth of the Vicos destruction. Picard encourages Data to follow what Troi suggests, and Data agrees. Before starting his task in watching over Timothy, Data asks Troi about how he should proceed. Troi replies, "Just be with him. Your presence he trusts and that what he needs most right now."

Data visits Timothy who is busy constructing a model of a Dakkoran temple. Data helps complete the model using his quick reflexes, much to Timothy's amazement. When Timothy asks him how he was able to build the model at such a high speed, Data explains that as an android, he is designed to excel in both physical and mental capacities, while not being able to express emotions. Fascinated by his android rescuer and intrigued by the fact that androids can't experience emotions, Timothy starts behaving like him. Timothy's new android persona - complete with Data's vernacular, body movements and Timothy's insistence that he is an android, mildly surprises and amuses Counselor Troi during a one-on-one appointment in the Ten Forward dining loft. Troi concludes to Picard and Data that Timothy is using the android persona as a way to help him cope, even suppress his emotions of trauma. She says that this android-persona will pass, but that it will go on until Timothy regains his emotional strength back. Picard instructs Data to make Timothy "the best android he can possibly be".

Data takes Timothy under his wing, teaching the orphaned boy on what it means to be an android. He grooms the boy's hair to look exactly like his own and accompanies him to his physical examination with Dr. Crusher, who plays along with the android idea. Timothy reveals that he has nightmares and is very afraid, but he believes that by behaving like an android he can suppress his emotions. While the two are painting, Data notices Timothy painting a violently expressive painting of what looks like an abstract explosion and asks whether it represents something. Timothy says that the painting doesn't represent anything, insisting that it is "just a painting". Data assures Timothy that he can tell him anything he wishes.

Over time, Timothy begins to open up to other people, even smiling and laughing at one point during school. Although she is happy with Timothy's progress, Troi feels that Data's work is not done yet, as she remarks, "A laugh is one step in the right direction, we need to help him take a few more steps." She suggests that Data tell Timothy about how humanity fascinates him, stating that it might help Timothy to be a boy again. At the Ten Forward bar, Data and Timothy dine on soft drinks. Upon Timothy's question on what he thinks of the drink, Data states that while he can analyze the components and textures of a dessert, he cannot taste. Data longingly muses over what it would be like to taste one's dessert and feel the anticipation and delight over a confection - a behaviour he observed in humans. Timothy argues that androids are faster and stronger than humans and that they do not need to feel bad all the time, but Data asserts that while androids are able to excel at skills of physical and mental abilities, they are incapable of emotions - like feeling proud over an accomplishment, something that humans are capable of doing. His final statement to Timothy is "I would gladly risk feeling bad at times, if it also meant that I could... taste my dessert."

Meanwhile, the Enterprise enters the black cluster. Lieutenant Worf (Michael Dorn) notices strange sensor readings that appear, disappear then reappear from starboard bow to port bow. Riker and Picard conclude that the wavefronts are echoing the Enterprises movements through the black cluster, distorting the motion sensors. A troubled Picard muses that while sensor distortion is uncommon in travelling through black clusters, none of the previously explored black clusters demonstrated gravitational waves as extreme as the Section 9-7 Back cluster. Eventually, the distortion becomes so strong, the sensors become useless. Captain Picard finds out that the ship was not destroyed by aliens after Data concludes that the distortion caused by the gravitational wave fronts in the black cluster interferes with all kinds of phaser fire. With Troi and Data present, Picard gently demands that Timothy tell the truth. Timothy firmly sticks to his story, insisting that the Vico was attacked, but Data calms him down, convincing him to tell the truth by telling him that androids do not lie. Timothy tearfully admits that he accidentally killed the crew of his ship when his arm touched a button on the computer control panel which caused the destruction of his ship. Data tells him that it is not possible since all starships require "user code clearance". Picard and Troi support this, assuring the distraught Timothy that because of the "user code clearance", he is not responsible for the tragic deaths of his parents.

Suddenly, a shock wave hits the Enterprise and Timothy says that his ship was also hit by a shock wave. Picard tells Worf to raise shields, but a new shock wave is even stronger than the first one. More power is diverted to the shields and another wave hits and is even stronger. While listening to the banter between captain and the crew, Timothy remembers that the Vicos crew were doing the same procedures of adding more power to the shields. With Timothy by his side, Data heads to the science aft on the bridge, computing the shield's strength and the rising strength of the shock waves. Picard and Geordi discuss putting the energy of the warp engine to the shields. Timothy states that is what they said the same "warp power to the shields" order on his ship.

Data suddenly asks Picard to lower the shields and Picard orders Worf to lower the shields, which he does. The next shock wave is harmless and the Enterprise is safe. Data had realized that giving energy to the shields caused even heavier shock waves (the more power the ship generated, the heavier the impact), and these were ultimately responsible for the destruction of Timothy's ship. Due to Timothy's memory and Data's speedy analysis, the Enterprise has been saved from the Vicos fate. The Enterprise leaves the black cluster.

Counselor Troi and Data watch Timothy in school and Troi concludes that while he is still filled with pain, Timothy has reverted to being a boy. Data has a heart-to-heart conversation with Timothy, who apologizes for acting like an android. Data, however, says that he has heard that imitation is the highest form of flattery and is not offended. Timothy asks if they can still do things together, Data replies that he would be pleased, even happy to count Timothy as one of his many human friends. In response, Timothy momentarily takes on an androidish expression and says, "That would be acceptable," before smiling.

Reception 
In 1993, Trek Van Hise in Trek: The Next Generation said the episode was "excellent" and noted Patrick Stewart as the director.

In 2000,  in Diplomacy, family, destiny: The Next Generation the episode was noted as a "bizarre psychological drama".

In 2011, The A.V. Club gave the episode a "B+", and while questioning the use of child actors, felt that the episode was example of how the series was willing to confront loss; overall they were happy with the writing and characters.

In 2020, GameSpot recommended this episode for background on the character of Data.

In 2020, Looper listed this as one of the best episodes for Data.

Releases 
The episode was released in the United States on November 5, 2002, as part of the season five DVD box set. The first Blu-ray release was in the United States on November 18, 2013, followed by the United Kingdom the next day, November 19, 2013.

Notes

External links

 

Star Trek: The Next Generation (season 5) episodes
1992 American television episodes
Television episodes directed by Patrick Stewart